Thoralf Sandaker (4 May 1923 – August 2020) was a Norwegian rower who competed in the 1948 Summer Olympics. He represented the club Christiania RK.

References

1923 births
2020 deaths
Norwegian male rowers
Olympic rowers of Norway
Rowers at the 1948 Summer Olympics